Shihori (written:  or  in hiragana) is a feminine Japanese given name. Notable people with the name include:

, Japanese actress
, Japanese field hockey player

Japanese feminine given names